Burkinabé Premier League is the top division of the Burkinabé Football Federation. It was created in 1961.
A total of 16 teams contested the league in 2013.

Teams
AS Maya (Relegated) (Bobo-Dioulasso)
AS SONABEL (Ouagadougou)
ASFA Yennenga (Ouagadougou)
ASFB Bobo (Bobo-Dioulasso)
Bobo Sport (Bobo-Dioulasso)
Bouloumpoukou FC (Koudougou)
Étoile Filante de Ouagadougou (Ouagadougou)
Majestic (Pô)
JCB (Relegated) (Bobo-Dioulasso)
Rail Club du Kadiogo (Kadiogo)
RC Bobo (Bobo-Dioulasso)
Santos FC (Ouagadougou)
US Comoé (Banfora)
US Forces Armées (Ouagadougou)
US Ouagadougou (Ouagadougou)
US Yatenga (Ouahigouya)

League table

References

External links
Soccerway

Burkinabé Premier League seasons